Barbara Morgenstern (born March 19, 1971) is a German electronic music artist, keyboardist and singer.

Biography
Born in Hagen, Germany, Morgenstern describes herself as self-taught, although she had piano lessons as a child and jazz lessons at the school of music in Hagen. In addition to having played in a band, she decided on a career in music in 1991 after completing her schooling at the Ernst Meister Gymnasium in Hagen-Haspe.

From 1992 until 1994 Barbara Morgenstern lived in Hamburg, working on her own music as well as singing in an a cappella group. She took part in a six-week popular music course at the Hamburg Hochschule. In 1994 she moved to Berlin, where she initially played keyboards in a band, and from 1996 onward she concentrated on her own music.

In early 1997 Morgenstern released the cassette Enter The Party through Hausfrau Im Schacht, a mail order label set up by former bandmate Florian Dietz (a.k.a. Jo Tabu). Later that same year she released the EP Plastikreport, which she produced in tandem with Michael Mühlhaus, later to join Blumfeld. In the winter of 1998, she toured Germany with backing from Christian Obermaier and the aforementioned Mühlhaus on bass guitar, and in September of that year, she toured Germany, Austria and Switzerland with other Berlin-based musicians including Quarks, Jo Tabu and Fuschimuschi. The following month saw the release of her first full-length album Vermona ET 6-1 on the Monika Enterprise label. 1999 saw the release of a remix EP, Fan No.1.

On her 2000 album Fjorden, Morgenstern worked with Stefan Betke (Pole) and Robert Lippok of To Rococo Rot. The 2001 release of the EP Eine Verabredung was accompanied by gigs in Glasgow and London. Another EP followed in 2002, Seasons, a collaboration with Robert Lippok, which was released in a limited run of 500 copies through Domino Recording Company. Morgenstern later worked with Robert Lippok on a full-length album, 2005's Tesri. Stefan Betke and Thomas Fehlmann assisted with the recording of Nichts Muss, released in 2003.

Another noted collaboration came in 2002, when she remixed DNTEL's "This is the Dream of Evan and Chan" which featured Ben Gibbard of Death Cab for Cutie on the single released for the track.

In 2004, at the invitation of the Goethe-Institut, Morgenstern undertook a 34-date world tour together with Maximilian Hecker. Bill Wells' 2004 mini-album Pick Up Sticks featured contributions from Morgenstern on two tracks. She also joined Paul Wirkus and To Rococo Rot's Stefan Schneider in September Collective, a project which had its origins in encores that they joined together to play at their own individual concerts while on tour in Poland. September Collective's eponymous debut album was released on the Geographic label, an offshoot of Domino Records run by the Pastels' Stephen Pastel. Morgenstern's next solo album was The Grass Is Always Greener (2006).

Discography

Albums
 Vermona ET 6-1 (1998)
 Fjorden (2000)
 Nichts Muss (2003)
 Tesri (with Robert Lippok, 2005)
 The Grass Is Always Greener (2006)
 BM (2008)
 Fan No.2 (2010)
 Sweet Silence (2012)
 Doppelstern (2015)
 Unschuld und Verwüstung (2018)

EPs
 Enter The Partyzone (cassette release, 1997)
 Plastikreport (1997)
 Fan No.1 (1999)
 Eine Verabredung (10" vinyl, 2001)
 Seasons (with Robert Lippok, 2002)
 Himmelmixe (2003)
 Come To Berlin Mixes (2008)
 Silence Sweater EP (Remix EP of the track 'Sweet Silence', 2012)
 Spring's Sprung EP (Remix EP of the track 'Spring Time'. Released on the Bit-Phalanx label, 2014)

References

External links 
 
 Soundcloud page
 
 Autobiography from the Monika Enterprise website

1971 births
Living people
People from Hagen
German electronic musicians
Women in electronic music